Piaski (1927–45 Klein Rauschen) is a village in the administrative district of Gmina Ełk, within Ełk County, Warmian-Masurian Voivodeship, in northern Poland.

References 

Villages in Ełk County